The 2022 London Sevens was the twentieth edition of the annual rugby sevens event held at Twickenham Stadium, Richmond, London.

The tournament winners were Australia. Australia won their second London Sevens event, beating trans-tasman rivals New Zealand in a thrilling extra-time victory (19–14). Two-time back-to-back defending champions Fiji finished third, beating Pacific Island neighbours Samoa 31–26.

The final victory was the first Sevens Series Australia has won since their home Sevens Series win in 2018. Following the event Australia jumped from third to second on the Sevens Series ladder. Similarly New Zealand jumped two places following their second-place finish (eleventh to ninth).

In World Rugby Sevens Series history, the second-last event of the series has been almost futile regarding seasonal points that the teams are vying for as most teams' points accrued in the second-last event would not affect their overall standing. However, during the 2021–22 season, the season standings pre- and post-London Sevens have been the most competitive since the establishment of the Sevens Series, with just eight points separating the top three teams (two points between the top two) before the tournament and six points after it. By the final event, there are mathematically four teams capable of taking the 2021–22 World Rugby Sevens Series title.

Format
The sixteen teams were drawn into four pools of four. Each team played the three opponents in their pool once. The top two teams from each pool advanced to the Cup bracket, with the losers of the quarter-finals vying for a fifth-place finish. The remaining eight teams that finished third or fourth in their pool played off for 9th place, with the losers of the 9th-place quarter-finals competing for 13th place.

Teams 
The sixteen national teams competing in London were:

Pool stage
The pools were officially announced on 25 May.

 Team advances to the Cup Quarter-finals

Pool A

Pool B

Pool C

Pool D

Knockout stage

13th–16th playoffs

9th–12th playoffs

5th–8th playoffs

Cup playoffs

Placings

References

2022
2021–22 World Rugby Sevens Series
2022 rugby sevens competitions
May 2022 sports events in the United Kingdom
2022 sports events in London
2021–22 in English rugby union